China–Mexico relations are the diplomatic relations between the People's Republic of China and the United Mexican States. Diplomatic relation were established in 1972. Both nations are members of the Asia-Pacific Economic Cooperation, G-20 major economies and the United Nations.

History

Chinese-Mexican contacts date to the early days of the Spanish Colonial Empire in the Americas and the Philippines. In the 16th-17th century, people, goods, and news traveling between China and Spain usually did so through the Philippines (where there was a large Chinese settlement) and (via the Manila galleon trade) to Mexico. The first two galleons loaded with Chinese goods arrived from the Philippines to Acapulco in 1573.

Of particular significance for the trade between the Spanish Colonial Empire and Ming and Qing China were the so-called "Spanish dollars", fine silver coins many of which were minted in Mexico from Mexican silver. Even after Mexican independence, and, later, the Spain's loss of the Philippines, Mexican dollars remained important for China's monetary system. During the late Qing, they became the standard relative to which the silver coins that China's provincial mints started to produce were to be valued.

This historic connection between the two countries is attested by two important early Spanish-language books (soon translated to Europe's other major languages) that were authored by Spanish ecclesiastics stationed in Mexico: Juan González de Mendoza's The history of the great and mighty kingdom of China and the situation thereof (1585) and Juan de Palafox y Mendoza's The History of the Conquest of China by the Tartars (posthumously published in 1670).

In December 1899, Imperial China and Mexico formally established diplomatic relations after signing a Treaty of Amity, Commerce and Navigation between the two nations. In 1904, Mexico opened its first diplomatic mission in Beijing and maintained a diplomatic mission in several cities where it was forced to move during various wars and instability until the mission was finally closed due to the Japanese invasion of China in 1941. In 1942, Mexico re-opened a diplomatic mission in the city of Chongqing and in 1943 diplomatic missions between the two nations were elevated to embassies.

In 1971, Mexico decided to break formal diplomatic relations with the Republic of China (Taiwan) after the successful passing of Resolution 2758 at the United Nations recognizing the People's Republic of China as the only legitimate representative of China to the United Nations. In February 1972, the People's Republic of China and Mexico established diplomatic relations. In 1973, Mexican President Luis Echeverría paid an official visit to China and met with Chinese Communist Party chairman Mao Zedong.

In 2005, Chinese leader Hu Jintao came to Mexico promising increased investment in industries like automobile-parts manufacture and mineral exportation. In July 2008, Mexican President Felipe Calderón reciprocated with a visit to Beijing in a bid to improve bilateral trade. Nevertheless, China has focused more on South American commodity producers such as Brazil and Chile to meet this end and fuel its chiefly-export economy. In 2008, Mexico exported just $2 billion worth of goods to China while importing some $34 billion from them, including clothing, electronics and "tourist trinkets".

2009 swine flu dispute 
In 2009, in the wake of fears of a worldwide swine flu pandemic, thought to have started in Mexico, relations between the two countries cooled substantially over China's decision to quarantine some seventy Mexican citizens, despite none of them showing symptoms of the virus. The Mexican government responded with outrage and, although China imposed the same measures on four nationals from the United States and more than twenty from Canada; dubbed the act discriminatory. Mexican Foreign Minister Patricia Espinosa used such terms as "unacceptable" and "without foundation", and advised compatriots not to travel to China.

Despite this, a mutual desire to increase bilateral trade and increase shipping of Mexican raw materials into China suggested that diplomatic tensions would be only temporary. "This should not affect the relationship in the medium-term because we are talking about an overreaction on both sides", said Enrique Dussel, an expert on Mexican-Chinese trade at the National Autonomous University of Mexico in Mexico City.

Post-2016 United States presidential election 
After the election of Donald Trump, China and Mexico pledged to deepen their diplomatic ties. On 12 December 2016, Chinese State Councillor Yang Jiechi met with Mexican Foreign Minister Claudia Ruiz Massieu to discuss improving transportation and trade between their countries. In July 2019, Mexican Foreign Minister Marcelo Ebrard paid a visit to China to give renewed impetus to trade and investment between both countries.

Relations in the 2020s 
In 2021, Mexican President Andrés Manuel López Obrador apologized for his country's role in the Torreón massacre where more than 300 Chinese Mexicans were massacred in 1911 in the northern city of Torreón during an unprovoked act of racism towards Mexico's Asian community.

In June 2022, both nations celebrated 50 years of diplomatic relations.

High-level visits

CCP leader, President and Premier visits from China to Mexico
 Premier Zhao Ziyang (1981)
 President Yang Shangkun (1990)
 Premier Li Peng (1995)
 President Jiang Zemin (1997, 2002)
 Premier Wen Jiabao (2003)
 President Hu Jintao (2005, 2012)
 President Xi Jinping (2013)

Presidential visits from Mexico to China

 President Luis Echeverría Álvarez (1973)
 President José López Portillo (1978)
 President Miguel de la Madrid Hurtado (1986)
 President Carlos Salinas de Gortari (1993)
 President Ernesto Zedillo (1996)
 President Vicente Fox (June & October 2001)
 President Felipe Calderón (2008)
 President Enrique Peña Nieto (2013, 2014, 2016, 2017)

Bilateral Agreements
Both nations have signed numerous bilateral agreements such as an Agreement on Trade (1975); Agreement on Tourism Cooperation (1978); Agreement on Cultural Exchanges (1979); Agreement on Technical and Scientific Cooperation (1990); Agreement of Cooperation in the Fight against Illicit Traffic and Abuse of Narcotic Drugs and Psychotropic Substances and Control of Chemical Precursors (1997); Agreement on Air Transportation (2005); Agreement to Avoid Double Taxation and Prevent Tax Evasion in Income Taxes (2006); Agreement for the Promotion and Reciprocal Protection of Investments (2009); Extradition Treaty (2012); Agreement of Mutual Administrative Assistance in Customs Matters (2013); Memorandum of Understanding between the Mexican Secretariat of Foreign Affairs and the Chinese Ministry of Science and Technology on Strengthening Cooperation in Advanced and New Technology and its Industrialization (2014); Agreement of Cooperation in Joint call on Research Projects on Science and Technology (2014); Memorandum of Understanding and Cooperation between the China National Petroleum Corporation and Pemex (2014); Memorandum of Understanding between the Mexican Secretariat of Economy and the Chinese National Development and Reform Commission for the Promotion of Investment and Industrial Cooperation (2014); Memorandum of Understanding on the Traceability of Tequila (2015); Memorandum of Understanding on Agricultural Cooperation (2015); Memorandum of Understanding for Electronic Exchange of Import and Export Certificates of Agricultural, Aquaculture and Fishing Goods (2015); Agreement for the Protocol of Phytosanitary Requirements for the Export of Maize from Mexico to China (2015); Agreement for the Inspection, Quarantine and Veterinary Health Conditions to Export Frozen Bovine Meat from Mexico to China (2015) and a Memorandum of Understanding on Cooperation in Industrial Property Matters (2015) (among others).

Tourism and travel
In 2014, approximately 63,000 Chinese citizens visited Mexico for business and/or tourism. Holders of Hong Kong passports and Macao passports do not need a visa to visit Mexico (mainland Chinese passport holders do require a visa). That same year, Chinese diplomatic offices in Mexico issued over 35,000 visas to Mexican citizens.

Trade
China has attempted to expand its investment and trade in Mexico in recent years, similar to China's moves elsewhere in Latin America and Africa. China was set to construct a $200 million, 1,400-acre mega-mall, Dragon Mart, near the beach resort of Cancún. The mall would have been not only a major emporium of Chinese goods, but also a gateway for Chinese goods elsewhere in the hemisphere. Mexican environmentalists have opposed the project on the grounds of environmental degradation of sensitive wetlands. The city of Cancún initially turned down the permit for the Chinese to build, but they appealed to the state of Quintana Roo and the federal government, which granted the permit. The government of Enrique Peña Nieto reversed that decision in January 2015. Mexico's environmental protection agency's head, Guillermo Haro, has cancelled the contract and imposed a fine of $1.5 million for damage already done. The mega-mall was likened to a permanent trade show, with booths for 3,000 exhibitors. Mexican industrialists were pleased with the government's decision because the mega-mall was expected to flood the Mexican market with Chinese goods. Environmentalists hailed the decision as a victory and a precedent for evaluating future projects. In November 2014, the Mexican government cancelled a contract for China to build a bullet train in Mexico. One of the successful bidders on that contract sold a mansion to the wife of the president on favorable terms.  The award was rescinded and a new bidding was to take place in 2015, but the government has "indefinitely suspended" the project.

In 2018, two-way trade between both nations amounted to US$90 billion. China is Mexico's fourth biggest export market in 2014 and second biggest import trading partner. Mexico's exports to China amount to US$5 billion each year while Mexico's imports from China amount to US$66 billion with a difference of US$61 billion in China's favor. Several Chinese multinational companies operate in Mexico such as Hisense, Huawei, JAC Motors, Lenovo and ZTE. At the same time, several Mexican multinational companies operate in China such as Gruma, Grupo Bimbo, Nemak and Softtek.

Resident diplomatic missions 
 China has an embassy in Mexico City and a consulate-general in Tijuana.
 Mexico has an embassy in Beijing and consulates-general in Guangzhou, Hong Kong, and Shanghai.

Academic connections
The National Autonomous University of Mexico has established a Center for Chinese-Mexican Studies in the faculty of economics, aimed at increasing the understanding of China and its relationship to Mexico. The center hosts conferences and publishes reports, among other activities.

See also
Embassy of Mexico, Beijing
Chinese immigration to Mexico
Torreón massacre

References 

 
Bilateral relations of China
China